AM3+ is a modification of the AM3 Socket, released in mid-2011, designed for CPUs which use the AMD Bulldozer microarchitecture and retains compatibility with AM3 processors. The Vishera line of AMD CPUs also all use Socket AM3+. It is the last AMD socket for which Windows XP support officially exists.

Technical specifications 
The AM3+ Socket specification contains a few noteworthy design changes over its AM3 predecessor. The 942 pin count for the AM3+ is an increase of one compared to the AM3 Socket layout.  The AM3+ Socket has larger pin socket diameter of 0.51 mm compared to 0.45 mm with the AM3 Socket.  There is a faster serial link of 3400 kHz from the CPU to the power controller, compared to 400 kHz.  The AM3+ Socket offers improved power regulation and power quality specifications, including an increased maximum current support of 145 A versus 110 A. There is also a redesigned CPU cooler retention harness allowing for slightly better airflow for CPU cooling, while retaining cooler backward compatibility.

Some manufacturers have brought AM3+ support to some of their AM3 motherboards via a simple BIOS upgrade.  Mechanical compatibility has been confirmed and it is possible for AM3+ CPUs to fit in AM3 boards, provided they can supply enough peak current.  Another issue is the use of the sideband temperature sensor interface for reading the temperature from the CPU. Therefore, some CPU PWM fan headers may only run at full speed. Also, certain power-saving features may not work, due to lack of support for rapid VCORE switching.

While AM3+ CPUs are technically pin-compatible with AM2 or AM2+ boards, they cannot work with them due to the DDR3 controller on the CPU being incompatible with the DDR2 memory taken by AM2 boards.

Heatsink 
The 4 holes for fastening the heatsink to the motherboard are placed in a rectangle with lateral lengths of 48 mm and 96 mm for AMD's sockets Socket AM2, Socket AM2+, Socket AM3, Socket AM3+ and Socket FM2. Cooling solutions should therefore be interchangeable.

See also 
 List of AMD FX microprocessors
 List of AMD chipsets

References 

AMD sockets